Laminacauda dysphorica is a species of sheet weaver found in Bolivia and Peru.

Taxonomy
Laminacauda dysphorica was first described by Eugen von Keyserling in 1886, as Erigone dysphorica. It was transferred to the genus Laminacauda by J. A. Miller in 2007.

References

Linyphiidae
Spiders of South America
Spiders described in 1886